Philippe Fargeon (born 24 June 1964) is a former French footballer who played striker.

External links
 Profile
 

1964 births
Living people
French footballers
France international footballers
Association football forwards
Ligue 1 players
AJ Auxerre players
AC Bellinzona players
FC Girondins de Bordeaux players
SC Toulon players
Servette FC players
FC Chiasso players